Cytoplasmic protein NCK1 is a protein that in humans is encoded by the NCK1 gene.

Gene 

The Nck (non-catalytic region of tyrosine kinase adaptor protein 1) belongs to the adaptor family of proteins. The nck gene was initially isolated from a human melanoma cDNA library using a monoclonal antibody produced against the human melanoma-associated antigen. The Nck family has two known members in human cells (Nck-1/Nckalpha and NcK2/NcKbeta), two in mouse cells (mNckalpha and mNckbeta/Grb4) and one in drosophila (Dock means dreadlocks-ortholog).

The two murine gene products exhibit 68% amino acid identity to one another, with most of the sequence variation being located to the linker regions between the SH3 and SH2 domains, and are 96% identical to their human counterparts. While human nck-1 gene has been localised to the 3q21 locus of chromosome 3, the nck-2 gene can be found on chromosome 2 at the 2q12 locus.

Function 

The protein encoded by this gene is one of the signaling and transforming proteins containing Src homology 2 and 3 (SH2 and SH3) domains. It is located in the cytoplasm and is an adaptor protein involved in transducing signals from receptor tyrosine kinases to downstream signal recipients such as RAS.

Nck1 has been linked to glucose tolerance and insulin signaling within certain tissues, namely the liver, in obese mice.  A deletion of the protein also causes a decrease of ER stress signaling within these obese cells, which is normally increased by the excessive fat.  This stress causes expression of the unfolded protein response pathway, which leads to a decrease in glucose tolerance and inactivation of insulin signaling in certain cell types.  This renewed glucose tolerance and insulin signaling is caused by the inhibition of the unfolded protein response pathway, particularly the protein IRE1alpha, and its subsequent phosphorylation of IRS-1 that causes insulin signaling to be blocked.  IRE1alpha is involved with the JNK pathway that is responsible for the phosphorylation of IRS-1.  Nck1 regulates the activation of IRE1alpha within the pathway and when removed from the pathway disrupts activation.  This means that Nck1 has an interaction with the UPR and that a deletion can cause a decrease in the stress pathway from the ER in the mice.  These deficient, obese mice also show increased insulin-induced phosphorylation of PKB within the liver but do not possess the same expression in adipose tissues or skeletal muscles.  This evidence points to the pathway being ER stress induced within liver tissue.

Nck1 has been shown to be associated with bone mass.  A deficiency in Nck1, which is shown to reduce ER stress in obese mice, also accelerates unloading-induced osteoporosis caused by mechanical stress.  This seems to suggest that would be a crucial protein involved with bone metabolism and that retention of bone tissue by a protein as yet unknown.  Nck1 expression increased twofold when involved with neurectomy-based unloading osteoporosis.  This then follows that in a deficient organism this upregulation would not be possible and thus the body would have increased bone loss due to the lack of expression of Nck1 to deal with the stress, which is what happens in vivo.  This acceleration of bone loss leads researchers to believe that the pathway for bone metabolism is highly regulated by several proteins that have yet to be discovered or incorporated into a schema.

Nck1 is involved with cellular remodeling via the WASp/Arp2/3 complex to coordinate actin cytoskeletal remodeling.  The WASp binds to the SH3 domains within the N-terminus of the protein and after Nck1 has been activated by the signal from the ligand binding to a receptor tyrosine kinase and then uses the WASp/Arp2/3 complex to reorganize the actin cytoskeleton and cause the polarization of the cell as well as promote directional migration via pseudopodia.  The reorganization of this cytoskeleton is caused by different Rho GTPases being moved to different locations within the cell, primarily to the leading edge, and strengthening the bonds with extracellular matrix components to induce motion.

Interactions 
NCK1 has been shown to interact with:

 ABL1,
 CBL,
 DNM1,
 DAG1,
 EIF2B2,
 EPHB1,
 EGFR,
 KHDRBS1,
 LCP2,
 MAP4K1,
 MAP4K4,
 MINK1,
 NCKIPSD,
 NEDD9,
 PAK1,
 PDGFRB,
 PKN2,
 PTK2,
 RASA1,
 RICS,
 RRAS,
 SOCS7,
 SOS1,
 TBK1,
 WASL,
 WIPF1, and
 WAS.

See also 
 Signal transducing adaptor protein
 Receptor tyrosine kinase
 Ras superfamily

References

Further reading

External links 
Nck1 Info with links in the Cell Migration Gateway 

Human proteins